Parisi is a municipality in the state of São Paulo in Brazil. The population is 2,169 (2020 est.) in an area of 84.5 km². The elevation is 496 m.

References

Municipalities in São Paulo (state)